Scenic Drive may refer to:

Roads
 Scenic Drive (Auckland), New Zealand
 Scenic Drive (El Paso), El Paso, Texas, United States
 Scenic Drive (Lethbridge, Alberta), Lethbridge, Alberta, Canada
 49-Mile Scenic Drive
 Bras d'Or Lakes Scenic Drive
 Kettle Moraine Scenic Drive
 La Jolla Scenic Drive, La Jolla, San Diego, California, United States (see also: Mount Soledad)
 North Shore Scenic Drive
 Pierce Stocking Scenic Drive
 Talimena Scenic Drive
 Veterans Evergreen Memorial Scenic Drive
 Yarra Scenic Drive

Music
 Scenic Drive (mixtape), a 2021 mixtape by Khalid

See also
 
 
 Scenic (disambiguation)
 Drive (disambiguation)